Castle Hill Railway or Castle Hill Funicular may refer to:

 Castle Hill Funicular (Budapest), a funicular railway in Budapest, Hungary
 Castle Hill Railway (Bridgnorth), a funicular railway in Bridgnorth, England
 Castle Hill Railway (Freiburg), a funicular railway in Freiburg im Breisgau, Germany
 Castle Hill Railway (Graz), a funicular railway in Graz, Austria

See also
 Castle Hill railway station, Sydney, Australia